Puck O'Neal Field at Big Rock Stadium is a baseball venue in Morehead City, North Carolina, United States. Also known as simply Big Rock Stadium, the venue is home to the Morehead City Marlins of the Coastal Plain League, a collegiate summer baseball league. The Marlins began play at the field for the 2010 season, after their arrival was announced in the fall of 2009.

Construction
The building project was set in motion in 2003 by V.J. "Puck" O'Neal, for whom the field is named. O'Neal agreed to support the project if an American Legion-level facility was constructed in the city. He donated $100,000 to the city to purchase land for the project. In 2007, the Big Rock Blue Marlin Tournament contributed $175,000 for construction of a stadium at the newly built facility. After the arrival of the Marlins was announced, further renovations of the field took place in the winter of 2009. Big Rock's funds were used to construct additional seating at the venue.

References

Minor league baseball venues
College baseball venues in the United States
Buildings and structures in Carteret County, North Carolina
Baseball venues in North Carolina
2010 establishments in North Carolina
Sports venues completed in 2010